Ikaw Lang is a 1993 Filipino action drama film directed by Chito S. Roño. The film stars Vilma Santos, Ronnie Ricketts and Cesar Montano.

Plot
A librarian's husband and mother-in-law turn out to be psychotically abusive. When the husband mistakenly thinks he has killed her, he dumps her in a river, where she is saved by a fisherman. Desperate for money and in need of help to take revenge on her husband, she hooks up with a bank robber whom she falls in love with. Together, they return to her husband's home in attempt to kill him and save her baby.

Cast
Vilma Santos as Celina
Ronnie Ricketts as Dalton
Cesar Montano as Alfred
Zeny Zabala as Martha
Dencio Padilla as Erning
Janine Barredo as Tess
Feling Cudia as Trining
Aurora Yumul as Yaya
Vangie Labalan as Senyang
Cris Daluz as Andres
Roldan Aquino as Sarge

Awards

References

External links

1993 films
1993 action films
1993 drama films
Filipino-language films
Moviestars Production films
Philippine action drama films